Jamides malaccanus is a butterfly of the lycaenids or blues family. It is found on Peninsular Malaysia, Langkawi, Pulau Tioman, Pulau Aur, Singapore, Sumatra, Java and probably in southern Thailand.

Subspecies
 J. m. malaccanus – (Peninsular Malaysia, Langkawi, probably southern Thailand)
 J. m. aurensis – (Pulau Tioman, Pulau Aur) 
 J. m. celinus – (Sumatra)
 J. m. saturatus – (Java)

References

Jamides
Butterflies described in 1886